The 1933 Miami Hurricanes football team represented the University of Miami as a member of the Southern Intercollegiate Athletic Association (SIAA) in the 1933 college football season. The Hurricanes played their home games at Moore Park in Miami, Florida. Led by third-year head coach Tom McCann, The Hurricanes finished their season 5–1–2 and were invited to the second annual edition of the Festival of Palms Bowl, where they lost to the Duquesne by a score of 33–7.

Schedule

References

Miami
Miami Hurricanes football seasons
Miami Hurricanes football